The String Quintet No. 6 in E-flat major, K. 614, was completed by Wolfgang Amadeus Mozart on April 12, 1791. It is Mozart's last major chamber work. Like all of Mozart's string quintets, it is a "viola quintet" in that it is scored for string quartet and an extra viola (two violins, two violas and cello.)

Movements
The work is in standard four movement form:
I. Allegro di molto  in E-flat major
II. Andante  in B-flat major
III. Menuetto: Allegretto  in E-flat major, with trio in E-flat major
IV. Allegro  in E-flat major

References
Melvin Berger, "Guide to Chamber Music", 2001, Dover

External links

Performance of String Quintet No. 6 by the Musicians from Marlboro from the Isabella Stewart Gardner Museum in MP3 format

String quintets by Wolfgang Amadeus Mozart
Stefan Zweig Collection
Compositions in E-flat major
1791 compositions